Xyris panacea, also called St. Marks yelloweyed grass, is a rare North American species of flowering plant in the yellow-eyed-grass family. It has been found only in the Florida Panhandle in the southeastern United States.

Xyris panacea  is a perennial herb up to 130 cm (52 inches or 4 1/3 feet) tall with long and narrow leaves up to 50 cm (20 inches) long, and yellow flowers.

References

External links
Photo of herbarium specimen at Missouri Botanical Garden, collected in Florida in 2007

panacea
Plants described in 2008
Flora of Florida